Glyceria striata is a species of Glyceria which is known by the common names fowl mannagrass and ridged glyceria. It is native to much of North America, from Alaska and northern Canada to northern Mexico.

It is a common bunchgrass species found in wet areas, often in forests.

Glyceria striata bears erect stems exceeding a meter in maximum height and firm, narrow leaves. The spreading branches of the inflorescence hold oval-shaped to nearly round spikelets each with generally fewer than six florets.

External links
Jepson Manual Treatment - Glyceria striata
USDA Plants Profile
Glyceria striata - Photo gallery

striata
Bunchgrasses of North America
Grasses of the United States
Grasses of Canada
Grasses of Mexico
Native grasses of California
Flora of the Sierra Nevada (United States)
Flora without expected TNC conservation status